John Marshall Hewitt (July 22, 1841 – February 29, 1888) was an American politician. He was a member of the Arkansas House of Representatives, serving from 1881 to 1889. He was a member of the Democratic party. He died of cancer.

References

1888 deaths
Speakers of the Arkansas House of Representatives
Democratic Party members of the Arkansas House of Representatives
1841 births
Politicians from Frankfort, Kentucky
19th-century American politicians
People from Lee County, Arkansas
Deaths from cancer in Arkansas